Kitchen Burnout is a British cookery reality show airing on ITV, and was created by ITV Studios, which features prospective chefs competing with each other for a final prize. The series aired in April 2010, presented by Marco Pierre White. The programme did not return for a second series due to poor ratings.

Celebrities

The celebrities taking part are:

 Automatic Qualification
 Saved By Marco
 Eliminated

References

External links

2010 British television series debuts
2010 British television series endings
British reality television series
Food reality television series
ITV (TV network) original programming
Television series by ITV Studios